Fakir Abdul Mannan (1901, Gazipur - 1994) was the former Minister of Agriculture of East Pakistan and lawyer.

Career 
Rahman was involved in the Pakistan Movement as a leader of the Muslim League. In 1960, Rahman was the Secretary of the Provincial Muslim League.

Mannan was the Minister of Food and Agriculture of East Pakistan from 1965 to 1968. He is a former Provincial General Secretary of East Pakistan Muslim League. He also served as the President of East Pakistan Provincial Muslim League and had called Bengalis "crooks that is why they respond to the leadership of a crook".

Rahman ran against Tajuddin Ahmad and lost to him by 13 thousand votes

Personal life 
Mannan' son, Hannan Shah, was a former Minister of Bangladesh and his other son, Shah Abu Nayeem Mominur Rahman, was a justice of Bangladesh Supreme Court.

Death 
Mannan died in 1994. He is buried in Chala Bazar, Gazipur.<

References 

Pakistani politicians
20th-century Bangladeshi lawyers
1901 births
1994 deaths
People from Gazipur District
20th-century Pakistani lawyers